Endothia radicalis is a plant pathogen. It was discovered in 1916 by Stephen Bruner. He found it growing on eucalyptus, mango and avocado.

References

External links 
 Index Fungorum
 USDA ARS Fungal Database

Diaporthales
Fungal plant pathogens and diseases
Fungi described in 1863